Fullerton Hotel may refer to:

Fullerton Bay Hotel, Singapore
The Fullerton Hotel Singapore
The Fullerton Ocean Park Hotel, Nam Long Shan, Hong Kong
 The Fullerton Waterboat House, Singapore